Scott Cleve (born July 22, 1982) is an American mixed martial artist who competed in Bellator's Featherweight division and the MFC.

Background
Cleve was born in Long Beach, California and raised in Escondido, California, attending Escondido High School where he competed in wrestling and football. Cleve continued with wrestling on a scholarship at Adams State University, receiving All-American honors his senior season. Two years after graduating, Cleve began training in mixed martial arts.

Mixed martial arts career

Early career
Cleve compiled an amateur record of 4–1 with the lone loss being against current World Series of Fighting lightweight champion, Justin Gaethje, before turning professional. From August 2010 to June 2013, Cleve amassed a record of 13–3, with most of his victories coming by KO/TKO. During this time, Cleve picked up notable victories over Abel Trujillo, Derek Campos and Ryan Schultz.

Bellator MMA
Cleve signed with Bellator and made his promotional debut on October 4, 2013 at Bellator 102 against Isaac DeJesus. He won the fight via TKO in the second round.

Cleve faced Daniel Weichel in the quarterfinals of Bellator's season ten featherweight tournament at Bellator 110. Cleve lost the fight via rear-naked choke submission in the first round.

Cleve fought Matt Bessette at Bellator 123 on September 5, 2014. Cleve won the fight via unanimous decision.

Cleve faced John Teixeira at Bellator 128 on October 10, 2014. He lost the fight via split decision.

Cleve next faced Noad Lahat at Bellator 164 on November 10, 2016. He lost the fight via submission in the first round. Some time after this fight, Cleve exited his contract with Bellator.

After Bellator
After a nearly six-year break, Cleve was scheduled to fight under the Battle Mixed Martial Arts promotion on 19 March 2022. However, he pulled out of the fight due to injury.

Mixed martial arts record

|-
| Loss
| align=center| 15–6
| Noad Lahat
| Submission (rear-naked choke)
| Bellator 164
| 
| align=center| 1
| align=center| 2:26
| Tel Aviv, Israel
| 
|-
| Loss
| align=center| 15–5
| John Macapá
| Decision (split)
| Bellator 128
| 
| align=center| 3
| align=center| 5:00
| Thackerville, Oklahoma, United States 
| 
|-
| Win
| align=center| 15–4
| Matt Bessette
| Decision (unanimous)
| Bellator 123
| 
| align=center| 3
| align=center| 5:00
| Uncasville, Connecticut, United States 
| 
|-
| Loss
| align=center| 14–4
| Daniel Weichel
| Submission (rear-naked choke)
| Bellator 110
| 
| align=center| 1
| align=center| 3:46
| Uncasville, Connecticut, United States 
| 
|-
| Win
| align=center| 14–3
| Isaac DeJesus
| TKO (punches)
| Bellator 102
| 
| align=center| 2
| align=center| 3:14
| Visalia, California, United States
| 
|-
| Win
| align=center| 13–3
| Rocky Johnson
| Submission (armbar)
| NMEF: Annihilation 46: Made For War
| 
| align=center| 3
| align=center| 4:20
| Colorado Springs, Colorado, United States
| 
|-
| Win
| align=center| 12–3
| Gilbert Jimenez
| TKO (punches)
| Made For War 2
| 
| align=center| 2
| align=center| 2:37
| Castle Rock, Colorado, United States
| 
|-
| Win
| align=center| 11–3
| Ryan Schultz
| KO (punches)
| SCL: Rise of the King
| 
| align=center| 1
| align=center| 3:04
| Denver, Colorado, United States
| 
|-
| Win
| align=center| 10–3
| Chris Manuel
| Decision (unanimous)
| Made For War 1
| 
| align=center| 3
| align=center| 5:00
| Castle Rock, Colorado, United States
|Featherweight debut.
|-
| Win
| align=center| 9–3
| Manuel Gallardo
| TKO (punches)
| Dollar D Promotions: Melon Thump'n 4
| 
| align=center| 1
| align=center| 3:11
| Rocky Ford, Colorado, United States
| 
|-
| Loss
| align=center| 8–3
| Gilbert Jimenez
| Submission (rear-naked choke)
| UWF: Tournament of Warriors Round 1
| 
| align=center| 3
| align=center| 3:17
| Corpus Christi, Texas, United States
|UWF Light Tournament Quarterfinal.
|-
| Win
| align=center| 8–2
| Steve Berger
| Submission (guillotine choke)
| Cage Championships 37
| 
| align=center| 1
| align=center| 1:02
| Washington, Missouri, United States
| 
|-
| Win
| align=center| 7–2
| Orlando Rodriguez
| TKO (punches)
| MFP: Vengeance
| 
| align=center| 2
| align=center| N/A
| Casper, Wyoming, United States 
| 
|-
| Win
| align=center| 6–2
| Johnny Torres
| TKO (head kick)
| ROF 42: Who's Next
| 
| align=center| 2
| align=center| 1:04
| Broomfield, Colorado, United States
| 
|-
| Win
| align=center| 5–2
| Derek Campos
| Decision (split)
| UWF 1: Huerta vs. War Machine
| 
| align=center| 3
| align=center| 5:00
| Pharr, Texas, United States
| 
|-
| Loss
| align=center| 4–2
| Charles Jones
| Decision (majority)
| C3 Fights: Great Plains Sizzling Slamfest
| 
| align=center| 3
| align=center| 5:00
| Newkirk, Oklahoma, United States
| 
|-
| Loss
| align=center| 4–1
| Mukai Maromo
| TKO (punches)
| MFC 30: Up Close & Personal
| 
| align=center| 1
| align=center| 0:36
| Edmonton, Alberta, United States
| 
|-
| Win
| align=center| 4–0
| Abel Trujillo
| Decision (split)
| EB: Beatdown at 4 Bears 8
| 
| align=center| 5
| align=center| 5:00
| New Town, North Dakota, United States
| 
|-
| Win
| align=center| 3–0
| Jos Eichelberger
| TKO (punches)
| Crowbar MMA: Winter Brawl
| 
| align=center| 1
| align=center| 4:40
| Grand Forks, North Dakota, United States
| 
|-
| Win
| align=center| 2–0
| Ali Hanjani
| TKO (punches)
| NMEF: Annihilation 30
| 
| align=center| 2
| align=center| 1:30
| Colorado Springs, Colorado, United States
| 
|-
| Win
| align=center| 1–0
| James Mead
| TKO (punches)
| Dollar D Promotions: Melon Thump'n 2
| 
| align=center| 1
| align=center| 0:58
| Rocky Ford, Colorado, United States
|

References

External links
Scott Cleve Bellator profile
Scott Cleve on Facebook
Scott Cleve on Twitter

Living people
1982 births
American male mixed martial artists
Featherweight mixed martial artists
Lightweight mixed martial artists
Mixed martial artists utilizing collegiate wrestling